1Password is a password manager developed by AgileBits Inc. It supports multiple platforms such as iOS, Android, Windows, Linux, and macOS. It provides a place for users to store various passwords, software licenses, and other sensitive information in a virtual vault that is locked with a PBKDF2-guarded master password. By default, the user’s encrypted vault is hosted on AgileBits’ servers for a monthly fee. The company is based in Toronto, Canada.

Password file syncing
1Password can be configured through 1Password.com, a paid subscription-based server sync service maintained by the developers. Local Wi-Fi and iCloud sync were only available on iOS and macOS in previous versions.

In 2017, the Travel Mode feature was introduced for subscribers of 1Password.com, which enables omission of password entries not tagged as safe for travel from the local storage on a particular device, reducing the impact of being obliged by officials to unlock access at country border crossings.

Browser extensions
1Password integrates with desktop web browsers including Safari, Chrome, Firefox, Edge, and Opera. The extension can remember logins for websites, fill in website logins automatically, and generate random passwords for new websites.

To use browser extensions, the user must have administrative rights on the computer where the browser is installed. This has been a problem with users on a PC assigned by a workplace without admin rights. To address this problem, 1Password offers plans for a monthly subscription fee aimed at businesses that allows web access to their usernames and passwords which can be copied and pasted into login screens. Plans for family and individual use are also available.

1Password also offers a standalone extension called 1Password X, available for Firefox, Chrome, and Opera. 1Password X is designed to work without a companion desktop app, but a 1Password.com subscription is required.

On the mobile side, 1Password offers integration with browsers and apps on iOS and Android devices using various methods. More convenient methods of filling and saving login information are provided in iOS 12 and Android Oreo (and later), respectively.

History
In a 2017 Consumer Reports article, Dan Guido, the CEO of Trail of Bits, listed 1Password as a popular password manager (alongside Dashlane, KeePass, and LastPass), with the choice among them mostly up to personal preferences.

Unlike previous versions, 1Password 7 became a subscription service, though perpetual licenses were still available from within the app ($64.99 in 2018). The option to store password vaults locally was removed in 1Pasword 8, which drew criticism.

On November 14, 2019, 1Password announced a partnership with venture capital firm Accel, which invested $200 million in a Series A funding round and obtained a minority stake in the company. It was the first outside funding in 1Password's history, and the largest single investment Accel had made to date.

In 2021, 1Password acquired SecretHub, a Dutch cybersecurity company. It also raised $100 million in financing with a valuation of $2 billion.

In January 2022, 1Password raised a $620 million Series C round, the biggest funding round in Canadian history, led by Iconiq Growth, increasing the company's valuation to $6.8 billion. Notable individual investors that took part in this round were Ryan Reynolds, Robert Downey Jr., and Justin Timberlake. 

In March 2022, Ryan Reynolds starred in a 1Password commercial from his creative agency, Maximum Effort, which features the Welsh soccer club that Reynolds co-owns, Wrexham A.F.C. 

In November 2022, 1Password announced its acquisition of Texas-based Passkey tool provider Passage for an undisclosed sum.

See also
 Password manager
 Cryptography
 List of password managers

References

External links
 

Password managers
Windows software
MacOS software
Linux software
IOS software
Android (operating system) software
2006 software
Shareware
WatchOS software
Google Chrome extensions
Microsoft Edge extensions
Nonfree Firefox WebExtensions